In female anatomy, the vestibular bulbs, bulbs of the vestibule or clitoral bulbs are two elongated masses of erectile tissue typically described as being situated on either side of the vaginal opening. They are united to each other in front by a narrow median band. Some research indicates that they do not surround the vaginal opening, and are more closely related to the clitoris than to the vestibule.

Structure
Research indicates that the vestibular bulbs are more closely related to the clitoris than to the vestibule because of the similarity of the trabecular and erectile tissue within the clitoris and bulbs, and the absence of trabecular tissue in other genital organs, with the erectile tissue's trabecular nature allowing engorgement and expansion during sexual arousal. Ginger et al. state that although a number of texts report that they surround the vaginal opening, this does not appear to be the case and tunica albuginea does not envelop the erectile tissue of the bulb.

The vestibular bulbs are homologous to the bulb of penis and the adjoining part of the corpus spongiosum of the male and consist of two elongated masses of erectile tissue. Their posterior ends are expanded and are in contact with the greater vestibular glands; their anterior ends are tapered and joined to one another by the pars intermedia; their deep surfaces are in contact with the inferior fascia of the urogenital diaphragm; superficially, they are covered by the bulbospongiosus.

Physiology
During the response to sexual arousal the bulbs fill with blood, which then becomes trapped, causing erection. As the clitoral bulbs fill with blood, they tightly cuff the vaginal opening, causing the vulva to expand outward. This puts pressure on nearby structures that include the corpus cavernosum of clitoris and crus of clitoris, inducing pleasure.

The blood inside the bulb's erectile tissue is released to the circulatory system by the spasms of orgasm, but if orgasm does not occur, the blood will exit the bulbs over several hours.

Additional images

References

External links
  - "The Female Perineum: Muscles of the Superficial Perineal Pouch"
 

Mammal female reproductive system